Morton Pinkney (also known as Morton Pinkney for Sulgrave) was a railway station on the Stratford-upon-Avon and Midland Junction Railway (SMJ) which served the Northamptonshire village of Moreton Pinkney between 1873 and 1952. It was situated not far from Sulgrave Manor, the ancestral home of George Washington's family.

History 
A line from Greens Norton junction near  to Stratford-upon-Avon and the junction with the Great Western Railway's Honeybourne branch line was first authorised in June 1864, but due to a lack of funds it took a further nine years for the line, built by the East and West Junction Railway (E&WJ), to be fully open to traffic. A station was opened at Moreton Pinkney, a Northamptonshire village  from Blisworth. As with other E&WJ stations, Morton Pinkney had a passing loop with two platforms and a single goods siding without a goods shed. To the west of the small brick station building lay a 12-lever signal box which was switched out at night to create a long section from Woodford West junction and  when services were signalled in both directions on the Up line.

A special gating crossing existed near the station for the use of local huntsmen, a key being provided to the local Master of Foxhounds. In 1912, the Stratford-upon-Avon and Midland Junction Railway, which had amalgamated with the E&WJ in 1908, agreed to cover all drains along the line and to replace barbed wire with ordinary wire in order to minimise the risk of injury to horse and hound. In an attempt to boost passenger traffic, the station began to appear as Morton Pinkney for Sulgrave in timetables from January 1913, the railway company hoping that the mention of Sulgrave, the location of the home of George Washington's ancestors, would encourage tourists to use the line. Passenger traffic continued to tail off and the station was finally closed in 1952, though the line through the station remained open for freight trains between Woodford West junction and Blisworth until 7 February 1964.

Routes

Present day 
The station site has been redeveloped into light industrial use and the station buildings have been removed. The gate leading to the site does however carry a sign bearing the station's name.

References

Disused railway stations in Northamptonshire
Former Stratford-upon-Avon and Midland Junction Railway stations
Railway stations in Great Britain opened in 1873
Railway stations in Great Britain closed in 1952
West Northamptonshire District